Ljiljana Ljubisic is a paralympic athlete from Canada competing mainly in category F12 throws events.

Ljiljana has competed in the shot and discus at four consecutive Paralympics.  She won the discus gold and shot silver medals in her second appearance in 1992 and followed this up with two bronze medals in the same events in 1996.  However she was unable to win any medals in the 2000 Summer Paralympics.

External link
Ljiljana (Lilo) Ljubisic:Dialogue with an Adventist world-class athlete College and University Dialogue Retrieved April 26, 2019

References

Paralympic track and field athletes of Canada
Athletes (track and field) at the 1988 Summer Paralympics
Athletes (track and field) at the 1992 Summer Paralympics
Athletes (track and field) at the 2000 Summer Paralympics
Athletes (track and field) at the 2004 Summer Paralympics
Paralympic gold medalists for Canada
Paralympic silver medalists for Canada
Paralympic bronze medalists for Canada
Living people
Medalists at the 1992 Summer Paralympics
Medalists at the 1996 Summer Paralympics
Canadian people of Serbian descent
Year of birth missing (living people)
Canadian Seventh-day Adventists
Paralympic medalists in athletics (track and field)